Dance! La Fuerza del Corazón, sometimes known with the short title Dance!, is a Uruguayan telenovela, produced by PowWow Media and SAETA TV Canal 10 in Montevideo, Uruguay, in which different stories of love, drama and dance are intertwined. It premiered on August 22, 2011 and aired Monday through Friday at 7:00 p.m. It ended on December 9 of the same year. It was created by Bill Borden and Barry Rosenbush, creators of the worldwide franchise High School Musical, stars Isabel Macedo, Juan Gil Navarro, Eva De Dominici, Mónica Galán, Maximiliano Ghione, Cristina Alberó, Mirella Pascual, Justina Bustos and Pablo Robles. The author is Patricia Maldonado.

Plot
Dance! Tells the story of four women from three different generations. First is Grandma Estela Redondo (Mónica Galán), a great retired dancer and owner of her own dance academy. Then, Laura "Pekas" Redondo (Isabel Macedo), Estela's daughter, a female fighter, and a recognized choreographer with two ex-husbands: Ricardo Gutiérrez (Juan Gil Navarro) and Jimmy Pereyra (Maximiliano Ghione). Finally, Miranda (Justina Bustos), daughter of Laura and Ricardo, talented singer and dancer, and Gala (Eva De Dominici), daughter of Laura and Jimmy, a sure girl who always achieves what He wants and demonstrates his passion for dancing. The story begins when the Redondo prepares for the auditions of the Estela dance academy. Laura would be a jury, and the two girls would audition, as would many more boys to be part of the academy. Gala and Miranda audition and are chosen because of their great talent and different dance styles, Miranda dances classical, and Gala dances modern. When Gala goes to the academy, she meets a boy who climbed to the fence of the same. This boy is Ramiro (Gonzalo de Cuadro), a talented dancer who had never had the opportunity to show his talent because from a very young age his parents abandoned him and had to be part of a group of orphaned boy gatherers called "Los Desechos" , led by Violeta (Chachi Telesco). Gala offers Ramiro a scholarship at her grandmother's academy and from that moment they become best friends. Renata (Thelma Fardin), who is also a member of "Los Desechos", does not like it at all, since Ramiro had been her best friend all her life and everything had changed with Gala's arrival in their lives. At first Renata judges Gala but after meeting her she realizes she is a great girl and they become great friends. In the academy, everything is revolutionized by the news that the work of Broadway "Hacia adelante" would be carried out with the direction of Estela, and that the dancers who would be part of this venture would be the students of the academy. From that news begin the auditions for the work. Miranda's group, formed by her friends Ciro, Lucía (Julia Middleton) and Clara (Giselle Motta). It remains in the play after the second audition. The same happens with the Gala group, formed by Ramiro (Gonzalo de Cuadro), Vicky (Jimena Sabaris), Federico (Diego Viquez), Martu (Julieta Bartolomé), Matías (Ezequiel Rojo) and Lucas (Gabriel Segredo). From the first moment they begin to see couples in Dance!. During the first chapters, Laura maintains a relationship with Manuel (Francisco Andrade), a student of the academy who is also quite younger than her, but then leaves because he does not feel comfortable being in a relationship with a boy who is almost the age of their daughters. On the other hand, Miranda is bridal with Javier (Rodrigo Raffeto), a boy who works as his father's right hand in the game. Gala, on a visit to his dad's bar, intersects with Nacho (Augusto Schuster) and falls in love with him immediately. Jimmy asks Nacho to infiltrate the academy and take care of his daughter at times when he cannot. Nacho accepts but eventually he falls in love with Gala. This is a problem for him because falling in love with her would be like letting Jimmy down, so he invents Gala that he cannot be with her because he is gay and his partner is Lucas. After a while Nacho and Lucas end this lie by saying that they had "separated." On the other hand, Renata, who was dating Federico, decides to leave because Federico was embarrassed to introduce Renata to her family. When he leaves, Renata begins to approach Lucas, and Federico Martu, which he uses as a screen so that his parents do not suspect that he is in love with Renata. In the end, Fede and Renata return because they realize they cannot be separated and Fede faces his parents. Gala tries to forget Nacho with the arrival of Teo (Francisco Donavan) in his life, a boy who has just lost his mother and his plans are to approach Gala to reach Jimmy for some reason that we do not know. Teo is closer to Miranda than Gala since with Miranda they share the greatest passion of their lives: music. This does not like either Gala or Javier, since they suspect that between them there is something more than a friendship, although Miranda denies it even to herself. Estela discovers that she has a disease that if not treated in time could be terminal. She decides to hide it from everyone, but despite this Gabe (Mirella Pascual) finds out, her best friend of a lifetime, who lives in the house of the Redondo. Gabe agrees to keep the secret and pretend that she is sick. In turn, try to convince Estela to operate. Finally she succeeds and the two travel to Chicago to perform the operation.

Broadcasts
The series was notable and other stations rebroadcast the series mainly during 2012 including stations in Chile, Nicaragua, Bolivia, Portugal and on Rai 2 Italian television.

Cast
 Isabel Macedo as Laura "Pekas" Redondo
 Juan Gil Navarro as Ricardo Gutiérrez
 Eva De Dominici as Gala Redondo
 Augusto Schuster as Nacho
  as Ciro
 Mónica Galán as Estela Redondo
 Maximiliano Ghione as Jimmy Pereyra
 Justina Bustos as Miranda Redondo
 Cristina Alberó as Sandra
 Mirella Pascual as Gabe
 Pablo Robles as Mickey
 Thelma Fardin as Renata
 Brian Evans as Emiliano
 Francisco Donavan as Teo
 Gonzalo Decuadro as Ramiro
 Chachi Telesco as Violetta
 Jimena Sabaris as Vicky
 Julieta Bartolomé as Martu
 Ezequiel Rojo as Matías
 Gabriel Segredo as Lucas
 Julia Middleton as Lucía
 Giselle Motta as Clara
 Diego Viquez as Federico
 Francisco Andrade as Manuel
 Luis Pazos as León
 Rodrigo Raffeto as Javier Pandolfo

Awards and nominations
The series was nominated for Best Fiction Series during the Uruguayan Iris Awards.

References

External links
 Official site.
 

2011 telenovelas
Teen telenovelas
Uruguayan television series
Spanish-language telenovelas
Musical telenovelas
Children's telenovelas
Canal 10 (Uruguay) original programming